Criteria for a Black Widow is the seventh studio album by Canadian heavy metal band Annihilator, released on June 1, 1999, by Roadrunner Records. It is the only album to feature the reunited Alice in Hell-era line-up (with the exception of bassist Wayne Darley, who declined to rejoin the band, and was replaced by Russ Bergquist).

Track listing

Personnel

Band members
Jeff Waters – guitar, bass, vocals, producer, engineer, mixing, liner notes
Randy Rampage – vocals
David Scott Davis – guitar
Russell Bergquist – bass (not on the album)
Ray Hartmann – drums

Production
Mike Rogerson – engineer
Paul Blake – assistant engineer
Craig Waddell – mastering
Victor Dezso – photography
Carol Sirna – model
Robert Stefanowicz – digital imaging
Ralph Alfonso – package design
Tom Bagley – restoration, drawing, logo illustration

References

Annihilator (band) albums
2000 albums
Roadrunner Records albums